The Scarlet Ending is a six piece indie rock band from Syracuse, New York. The group is fronted by identical twin sisters Kayleigh Goldsworthy (Vocals, Guitar, Violin) and Kaleena Goldsworthy (Vocals, Piano, Accordion, Pennywhistle, Melodica, Ukulele), with Jon Tedd (Guitar, Vocals), Jess Hafner (Cello, Synthesizer), Nick Streeter (Drums, Percussion), and Aaron Garritillo (Bass guitar)

Career
The Scarlet Ending was started by identical twin sisters Kayleigh and Kaleena in 2002. In 2008 the band grew to include Jon, Jess, Nick, and Aaron.

Discography

Full lengths
Cries and Whispers - Released by Fierce Little Records (formerly SubCat Records) 
Ghosts - Released by Fierce Little Records March 9, 2010

EPs
The Scarlet Ending - Released independently 
The Things You Used to Own - Released by Fierce Little Records August 14, 2012

Awards and honors
SAMMY (Syracuse area music) award for best pop recording 2006. 
SAMMY (Syracuse area music) nominee for best pop recording 2007.
SAMMY (SYRACUSE area music) Award for best Alternative. 2011.

Media use
The song "The Way We Used to Be," off the CD "Cries and Whispers" appeared on Season 3 of MTV's "The Hills," and was also featured on the DVD release. The song was also featured on season 4 of "Making the band".
The song "Winter," off the CD "Cries and whispers" appeared on Season 1 of VH1's "Tool Academy"

Notable touring
In the summer of 2008, the band toured both Greenland and Germany for Armed Forces Entertainment.

In September and October 2009, the band toured Southwest Asia with Armed Forces Entertainment.

Equipment
Kayleigh Goldsworthy uses Glasser Bows exclusively.

External links

Official website
Online press kit
Knox road interview with the band.

Notes

Indie rock musical groups from New York (state)
Musical groups from Syracuse, New York
Musical groups established in 2002